John MacPherson or Macpherson may refer to:

John Macpherson (minister) (1710–1765), Scottish minister and antiquarian
Sir John Macpherson, 1st Baronet (1745–1821), Scottish administrator in India
John Alexander MacPherson (1833–1894), Australian politician
John Andrew MacPherson (1856–1944), New Zealand politician, Liberal Party MP
John Thomas Macpherson (1872–1921), British Member of Parliament for Preston, 1906–1910
Sir John Stuart Macpherson (1898–1971), governor of Nigeria, 1948–1955
John Macpherson (privateer), Scottish-born privateer

See also
John McPherson (disambiguation)